In enzymology, an alpha-glucan, water dikinase is an enzyme that catalyzes the chemical reaction

ATP + alpha-glucan + H2O  AMP + phospho-alpha-glucan + phosphate

The 3 substrates of this enzyme are ATP, alpha-glucan, and H2O, whereas its 3 products are AMP, phospho-alpha-glucan, and phosphate.

This enzyme belongs to the family of transferases, specifically those transferring phosphorus-containing groups (phosphotransferases) with paired acceptors (dikinases). The systematic name of this enzyme class is ATP:alpha-glucan, water phosphotransferase. This enzyme is also called starch-related R1 protein, GWD.

References

 
 

EC 2.7.9
Enzymes of unknown structure